Mountain View is a census-designated place (CDP) in Catawba County, North Carolina, United States. The population was 3,552 at the 2010 census. It is part of the Hickory–Lenoir–Morganton Metropolitan Statistical Area.

Geography
Mountain View is located in western Catawba County at  (35.681990, -81.367999). It is bordered to the north by the town of Long View and to the northeast by the town of Brookford. The city of Hickory, located north of Brookford, has been extending its borders through annexation into the Mountain View area and now nearly splits the CDP into north and south halves.

North Carolina Highway 127 passes through the community, leading north  to the center of Hickory and south  to NC Highway 10. U.S. Route 321, a four-lane expressway, crosses the eastern corner of the Mountain View CDP, where its Exit 42 provides access to NC 127.

Demographics

2020 census

As of the 2020 United States census, there were 3,590 people, 1,478 households, and 986 families residing in the CDP.

2000 census
As of the census of 2000, there were 3,768 people, 1,364 households, and 1,104 families residing in the CDP. The population density was 781.4 people per square mile (301.8/km2). There were 1,404 housing units at an average density of 291.2 per square mile (112.5/km2). The racial makeup of the CDP was 89.15% White, 5.97% African American, 0.35% Native American, 3.29% Asian, 0.16% Pacific Islander, 0.42% from other races, and 0.66% from two or more races. Hispanic or Latino of any race were 1.30% of the population.

There were 1,364 households, out of which 39.5% had children under the age of 18 living with them, 68.0% were married couples living together, 9.7% had a female householder with no husband present, and 19.0% were non-families. 16.6% of all households were made up of individuals, and 5.0% had someone living alone who was 65 years of age or older. The average household size was 2.76 and the average family size was 3.09.

In the CDP, the population was spread out, with 27.5% under the age of 18, 6.3% from 18 to 24, 31.2% from 25 to 44, 27.0% from 45 to 64, and 8.0% who were 65 years of age or older. The median age was 37 years. For every 100 females, there were 94.0 males. For every 100 females age 18 and over, there were 90.5 males.

The median income for a household in the CDP was $51,974, and the median income for a family was $56,313. Males had a median income of $35,635 versus $27,128 for females. The per capita income for the CDP was $22,125. About 2.6% of families and 5.0% of the population were below the poverty line, including 5.3% of those under age 18 and 5.7% of those age 65 or over.

References

Census-designated places in Catawba County, North Carolina